Edison Reynoso (born November 10, 1975 in Monte Cristi, Dominican Republic) is a former professional baseball pitcher who played professionally from 1999 to 2004. Reynoso played in Japan for the Hiroshima Toyo Carp in the Central League in 1999 and 2000. He signed with the New York Yankees in 2001, and played in there minor league system in 2001 and 2003. In 2004, Reynoso played for both the Newark Bears and the North Shore Spirit.

External links

Nippon Professional Baseball career statistics from Baseball-Reference

1975 births
Living people
Dominican Republic expatriate baseball players in Japan
Nippon Professional Baseball pitchers
Hiroshima Toyo Carp players
Tampa Yankees players
Norwich Navigators players
Staten Island Yankees players
Trenton Thunder players
Newark Bears players
North Shore Spirit players